The Ardmore Historic Commercial District, in Ardmore, Oklahoma, is a  historic district which was listed on the National Register of Historic Places in 1983.

The district includes 97 "major structures", in total having 133 contributing buildings.  It runs along Main St. from the former Santa Fe railroad tracks to B St., N. Washington from Main to 2nd Ave., NE., and Caddo from Main to the northern side of 2nd Ave., NE.

It includes:
the U.S. Courthouse Building  at 200-202 W. Main, a two-story red brick building designed by architect C.E.Troutman, built 1896–1898.
Masonic Temple Building at northwest corner of Main and Washington Streets, built 1896–1898, a three-story red brick Victorian Romanesque building, with limestone and brick detailing.

Ardmore has an Ardmore Main Street Authority, one of the various Main Street programs which act in the interests of commercial district revitalization.

References

External links

Historic districts on the National Register of Historic Places in Oklahoma
National Register of Historic Places in Carter County, Oklahoma
Victorian architecture in Oklahoma
Neoclassical architecture in Oklahoma